No Surrender may refer to:

Politics
 "No Surrender!", a British Unionist slogan originating from Siege of Derry now used in Northern Ireland, Scotland, and England
No Surrender (to the IRA), a political chant since used by England football fans

Books
 No Surrender, 1911 novel by suffragette Constance Maud
 No Surrender (novel), a 1942 thriller novel by Martha Albrand
 No Surrender: My Thirty-Year War, an autobiography by World War II Japanese holdout Hiroo Onoda

Film and TV
 No Surrender, a 2002 short film by Richard James Allen
 No Surrender (film), a 1985 comedy starring Michael Angelis
 Impact Wrestling No Surrender, a professional wrestling pay-per-view event
 "No Surrender, No Retreat" (Babylon 5), a 1997 episode of Babylon 5
Karmouz War, released in English as No Surrender (2018), Egyptian war/action film

Crime
No Surrender (gang), a gang in the Netherlands, founded 2013

Music
 No Surrender, No Retreat (album), a 1998 album by Bushwick Bill

Songs
"No Surrender", an Ulster pipe tune AKA "The Crimson Banner"
 "No Surrender", a 1943 song composed by Eisler for Hangmen Also Die!
 "No Surrender" (song), a 1984 song by Bruce Springsteen

See also
 No Retreat, No Surrender, a 1986 martial arts film
 No Retreat, No Surrender: One American's Fight, a 2007 book by Tom DeLay and Stephen Mansfield
 Van Morrison: No Surrender, a 2005 biography on Van Morrison by Johnny Rogan
 Never Surrender (disambiguation)